Toham Mountain or Toham-san  is a mountain with a height of  in Gyeongju City in southeastern South Korea. It is part of the minor Dongdae Mountains range. The mountain lies within Gyeongju National Park and is the site of a large number of historic relics. The Silla-era Buddhist shrines of Bulguksa and Seokguram are on its slopes. The mountain stands at the intersection of three subdivisions of Gyeongju: Bulguk-dong, Bodeok-dong, and Yangbuk-myeon. The Sea of Japan can be seen from the peak, as can Gyeongju Basin, which includes the city center. 

During the Silla period, Toham mountain was referred to as Dongak (東嶽), literally meaning "East Big Mountain", and considered a guardian mountain of the country, so that major rituals were held.

See also
Geography of South Korea
Korean peninsula
List of mountains in Korea

References

External links

 근교산 & 그너머 <365> 경주 토함산 at Kookje Sinmun

Gyeongju
Mountains of South Korea
Mountains of North Gyeongsang Province